Abigail Reynolds is an American author and physician. She is best known as the author of Jane Austen-inspired novels in the Pemberley Variations series as well as modern novels set on Cape Cod.

Biography

Abigail Reynolds was raised in upstate New York.  She studied Russian and theater at Bryn Mawr College in Pennsylvania and marine biology at the Marine Biological Laboratory in Woods Hole, Massachusetts. After working in performing arts administration, she attended medical school.  She took up writing as a hobby during her years as a physician in private practice.  She lives in Falmouth, Massachusetts, with her husband and son.

She began her writing career in 2001 by posting her novels on Jane Austen fan fiction sites on the internet, and later self-publishing them. Her works were discovered by an editor at Sourcebooks who purchased the rights to her first six books.  Her earliest writings were variations on Jane Austen's Pride & Prejudice, focusing on different plot developments that might change the course of the original story, but always with the same resolution of Elizabeth Bennet marrying Mr. Darcy, a series which she later titled The Pemberley Variations.  Her modern adaptation, The Man Who Loved Pride & Prejudice, features a female marine biologist who teaches at the Marine Biological Laboratory and at Haverford College. Her 11 books have sold over 180,000 copies.

The Pemberley Variations 
The Pemberley Variations is a series of novels exploring the roads not taken in Jane Austen's Pride & Prejudice, as Elizabeth Bennet and Mr. Darcy journey through new challenges to reach a satisfying conclusion. Set during the Regency, these historical novels provide a heartwarming and satisfying opportunity for lovers of Pride & Prejudice to return to visit with beloved characters and new ones as well.

Bibliography
 Impulse and Initiative (2008) republished in mass market paperback as To Conquer Mr. Darcy (2010)
 Pemberley by the Sea (2008) republished in mass market paperback as The Man Who Loved Pride & Prejudice (2010)
 Mr Fitzwilliam Darcy: The Last Man In The World (2010); originally self-published as "The Last Man in the World" (2007)
 Mr. Darcy's Obsession (2010)
 What Would Mr. Darcy Do? (2011); originally self-published as "From Lambton to Longbourn" (2007)
 Mr. Darcy's Undoing (2011); originally self-published as "Without Reserve" (2007)
 By Force Of Instinct (2007, 2011)
 A Pemberley Medley (2011)
 Morning Light (2011)
 Mr. Darcy's Letter (2011)
 Mr. Darcy's Refuge (2012)
 Mr. Darcy's Noble Connections (2013)
 The Darcys of Derbyshire (2013)
 Alone with Mr. Darcy (2015)
 Mr. Darcy's Journey (2016)
 Conceit & Concealment (2017)
 Mr. Darcy's Enchantment (2018)
 A Matter of Honor (2019)
 The Price of Pride (2020)

External links 
 Abigail Reynolds' website
 Abigail Reynolds' author page at Amazon.com

References

21st-century American novelists
American romantic fiction writers
Living people
American women novelists
Women romantic fiction writers
21st-century American women writers
Year of birth missing (living people)